The former First Church of Christ, Scientist, built in 1912, is a historic Christian Science church edifice located at 1366 South Alvarado Street in Pico-Union, Los Angeles, California.

The former church is a Historic district contributing property in the Alvarado Terrace Historic District, which was added on May 17, 1984, to the National Register of Historic Places. It is also a Los Angeles Historic-Cultural Monument.

History
The First Church of Christ, Scientist was designed by noted Los Angeles architect, Elmer Grey in a mixture of Beaux Arts—Italianate—Spanish Romanesque Revival styles.

The church building was sold in 1972 and was used as a synagogue for a time. It then become the Los Angeles branch of the ill-fated  Disciples of Christ church, known as the Peoples Temple, led by the Reverend Jim Jones. First Church of Christ, Scientist, is no longer listed in the Christian Science Journal.

It is now a Spanish-speaking Seventh-day Adventist church called Iglesia Adventista Central.

See also
 Second Church of Christ, Scientist
List of Los Angeles Historic-Cultural Monuments in South Los Angeles
List of former Christian Science churches, societies and buildings
National Register of Historic Places listings in Los Angeles
First Church of Christ, Scientist (disambiguation)

References

External links

Churches in Los Angeles
Former Christian Science churches, societies and buildings in California
Churches completed in 1912
1912 in California
Los Angeles Historic-Cultural Monuments
Properties of religious function on the National Register of Historic Places in Los Angeles
Historic district contributing properties in California
Elmer Grey church buildings
Beaux-Arts architecture in California
Italianate architecture in California
Romanesque Revival church buildings in California
Pico-Union, Los Angeles
1912 establishments in California
Churches on the National Register of Historic Places in California
Italianate church buildings in the United States